is a Japanese gravure idol and tarento. She is represented by the talent agency 01familia.

Career
Aoyama debuted as a gravure idol in 2013.  In April of the same year, she won the first "Jigadoru" Contest Grand Prix (Lily Franky Award) and in October, won the Nippon TV's "Shiodome Gravure Koshien 2014" Special Fan Award. She also won the Idol DVD Award as Selected by Professionals 2014.

In May, 2015, she graduated from her gravure idol group of Sakuragaoka Chocolat and joined a new group called Sherbet in August of the same year.

She left her former agency, Entermax Promotions, in 2017 and joined her current agency, 01familia. She continues her activities with appearances on magazine covers, often with other models of her agency.

She made an appearance in the video game Yakuza Kiwami 2 as a gravure idol, which was released in December, 2017.

References

External links
 Official Profile - 01familia
 Official Site - sherbet 
 Hikaru Aoyama(hikaru0613kon) - Ameba Blog
 
 Hikaru Aoyama(@hikaru0613kon) - Instagram

Japanese gravure idols
People from Sasebo
Models from Nagasaki Prefecture
1993 births
Living people